Bryconaethiops is a genus of African tetras.

Species
There are currently five recognized species in this genus:
 Bryconaethiops boulengeri Pellegrin, 1900
 Bryconaethiops macrops Boulenger, 1920
 Bryconaethiops microstoma Günther, 1873
 Bryconaethiops quinquesquamae Teugels & Thys van den Audenaerde, 1990
 Bryconaethiops yseuxi Boulenger, 1899

References

Alestidae
Fish of Africa
Taxa named by Albert Günther